Mallard Lake is a manmade freshwater lake in the unincorporated community of Hunter's Creek, in south Orange County, Florida. Originally part the area of the lake and part of the area surrounding the lake was swamp land. The rest was dry land, according to topographical maps. The lake was built in or before the early 1990s to serve two Hunter's Creek communities developed in the 1990s. One is Mallard Cove, on the west and southwest sides of the lake, in which 182 homes were built from 1992 to 1996. The other community is Falcon Pointe, to the northeast, east and southeast sides of Mallard Lake. From 1991 to 1996, 165 homes were built in Falcon Pointe.

Another manmade lake is in the area, Lake Talova. It is just to the north of Mallard Lake. Talova Drive is on the strip of land separating the two lakes. A cove on Mallard Lake's south side borders Town Center Boulevard, the area's major thoroughfare. The Hunter's Creek website says the public cannot fish in these lakes or use boats on them. However, Hunter's Creek residents may do so. Neither lake has a boat ramp, so only small boats can be launched.

References

Lakes of Orange County, Florida
1990s establishments in Florida
Lakes of Florida